DQ2 may be:

 Deltora Quest 2, a children's book.
 Dragon Quest II, a role-playing video game.
 HLA-DQ2, a human leukocyte antigen of the HLA DQ type.